The 10th Infantry Brigade was a Regular Army infantry brigade of the British Army. During the First and the Second World Wars, the brigade was part of the 4th Infantry Division.

History

Formation
The 10th Brigade was first formed in the early 1900s, originally based at Shorncliffe Army Camp and serving with the 5th Division in the 2nd Army Corps until 1907; and 4th Division, Eastern Command from 1907 until 1914; Northern Command-1920; 4th Division, Eastern Command from 1920;

First World War
With the 4th Division, the 10th brigade served with the British Expeditionary Force (BEF) on the Western Front and was one of the first British units to be sent overseas upon the declaration of war. The brigade fought in the Battle of Mons and the subsequent retreat from Mons and many other battles such as that as First Ypres, the Somme and Third Ypres.

Order of battle
The 10th Brigade was constituted as follows during the war:
 1st Battalion, Royal Warwickshire Regiment
 2nd Battalion, Seaforth Highlanders
 1st Battalion, Royal Irish Fusiliers (until August 1917)
 2nd Battalion, Royal Dublin Fusiliers (until November 1916)
 1/7th Battalion, Argyll and Sutherland Highlanders (from January 1915 until March 1916)
 Household Battalion (from November 1916 until February 1918)
 3/10th Battalion, Middlesex Regiment (from August 1917 until February 1918)
 2nd Battalion, Duke of Wellington's Regiment (from February 1918)

Between the wars

Second World War
The 10th Infantry Brigade, commanded since August 1938 by Brigadier Evelyn Barker, again saw active service as part of the British Expeditionary Force (BEF) that was sent to France after the outbreak of war in 1939, arriving there on 1 October, less than a month since the outbreak of the Second World War. The brigade and division were evacuated at Dunkirk after fierce fighting in the battles of France and Belgium.

After being based in the United Kingdom, the brigade spent many years on home defence and training duties, anticipating a German invasion which never arrived. The brigade was later sent to Algeria and Tunisia in 1943.

After this the brigade fought in Italy where it saw extremely hard fighting at Monte Cassino through most of 1944, before being shipped off to Greece to help calm the Civil War as part of Lieutenant General Ronald Scobie's III Corps, where it ended the war.

Order of battle
The 10th Infantry Brigade was constituted as follows during the war:
 2nd Battalion, Bedfordshire and Hertfordshire Regiment
 2nd Battalion, Duke of Cornwall's Light Infantry
 1st Battalion, Queen's Own Royal West Kent Regiment (to May 1940)
 10th Infantry Brigade Anti-Tank Company
 1/6th Battalion, East Surrey Regiment (from May 1940)

Postwar
The brigade was disbanded in Greece in 1947. However, following the reactivation of the 4th Infantry Division on 1 April 1956, from the 11th Armoured Division of the British Army of the Rhine (BAOR), the 10th Brigade, formerly the 91st Lorried Infantry Brigade, again became part of the division (again, along with the 11th and 12th Infantry Brigades). The brigade headquarters was at Essex Barracks in Hildesheim until it was finally disbanded in April 1958.

Commanders
The following officers commanded the 10th Infantry Brigade throughout its existence:
 Brigadier-General William E. Franklyn: October 1902 – March 1904
 Brigadier-General Samuel H. Lomax: April 1904 – April 1908
 Brigadier-General the Hon. Edward J. Montagu-Stuart-Wortley: April 1908 – April 1912
 Brigadier-General J. Aylmer L. Haldane: April 1912 – November 1914
 Brigadier-General C.P. Amyatt Hull: November 1914 – February 1916
 Brigadier-General Charles A. Wilding: February–December 1916
 Brigadier-General Charles Gosling: December 1916 – April 1917
 Lieutenant-Colonel G. N. B. Forster: 12 April 1917 (acting)
 Brigadier-General Aubrey G. Pritchard: April–November 1917
 Brigadier-General H.W. Green: November 1917 – April 1918
 Brigadier-General John Greene: April 1918 – December 1919
 Brigadier-General Winston J. Dugan: December 1919 – December 1923
 Brigadier-General Albemarle B.E. Cator: December 1923 – October 1925
 Brigadier-General Thomas W. Stansfeld: October 1925 – March 1929
 Brigadier Francis H. Stapleton: March 1929 – March 1932
 Brigadier William N. Herbert: March 1932 – August 1934
 Brigadier Robert H. Willan: August 1934 – August 1938
 Brigadier Evelyn H. Barker: August 1938 – October 1940
 Brigadier Walter E. Clutterbuck: October 1940 – November 1941
 Brigadier Owen M. Wales: November 1941 – June 1942
 Brigadier John H. Hogshaw: June 1942 – December 1943
 Brigadier Stephen N. Shoosmith: December 1943 – March 1945
 Brigadier Rudolph C.H. Kirwan: March 1945
 Brigadier John A. Mackenzie: March 1945–
 Brigadier Graham Peddie: 1953 – April 1956
 Brigadier Ronald C. Macdonald: April 1956 – 1959

References

Bibliography
 

Infantry brigades of the British Army in World War I
Infantry brigades of the British Army in World War II
Military units and formations established in the 1910s